In modern Western body piercing, a wide variety of materials are used. Some cannot be autoclaved, and others may induce allergic reactions, or harbour bacteria. Certain countries, such as those belonging to the EU, have legal regulations specifying which materials can be used in new piercings.

Minimum standards for jewelry for initial piercings
The Association of Professional Piercers has developed safety standards for body jewelry based on research and historical experience.

Products with an ISO or ASTM designation are so noted and a statement specifying the finish requirements particular to body jewelry has been added. In addition, several materials designated for applications other than implants have been proven through historical and practical application to be suitably biocompatible for initial piercing.

 Steel that is ASTM F-138 compliant or ISO 5832-1 compliant
 Steel that is ISO 10993-6, 10993-10, and/or 10993-11 compliant
 Titanium (Ti6Al4V ELI) that is ASTM F136 compliant or ISO 5832-3 compliant
 Titanium that is ASTM F-67 compliant
 Solid 14-carat or higher nickel-free white or yellow gold
 Solid nickel-free platinum alloy
 Niobium (Nb)
 Fused quartz glass, lead-free borosilicate or lead-free soda-lime glass
 Polymers (plastics) as follows:
 Tygon Medical Surgical Tubing S-50HL or S-54HL
 Polytetrafluoroethylene (PTFE) that is ASTM F754-00 compliant
 Any plastic material that is ISO 10993-6, 10993-10 and/or 10993-11 compliant and/or meets the United States Pharmacopeia (USP) Class VI material classification.

Minimum Standard for Jewelry Threading for Initial Piercings 
All threaded or press-fit jewelry must have internal tapping (no screw threads on posts).

Minimum Standard for Jewelry Surface Finish for Initial Piercings 
For body jewelry purposes, surfaces and ends must be smooth, free of nicks, scratches, burrs, polishing compounds and metals must have a consistent mirror finish.

Metals

Steel

Surgical stainless steel is a grade of stainless steel that is used in biomedical applications. The most common "surgical steels" are austenitic 316 stainless and martensitic 440 and 420 stainless steels. There is no formal definition on what constitutes a "surgical stainless steel", so product manufacturers and distributors apply the term to refer to any grade of corrosion resistant steel.

316 stainless steel, also referred to as marine grade stainless steel, is a chromium, nickel, molybdenum alloy of steel that exhibits relatively good strength and corrosion resistance. Along with the titanium alloy Ti6Al4V, 316 stainless is a common choice of material for biomedical implants. Although Ti6Al4V provides greater strength per weight and corrosion resistance, 316 stainless components can be more economical to produce. However, immune system reaction to nickel is a potential complication of 316.[1][2] Implants and equipment that are put under pressure (bone fixation screws, prostheses, body piercing jewelry) are made out of austenitic steel, often 316L and 316LVM compliant to ASTM F138,.[3] 316 surgical steel is used in the manufacture and handling of food and pharmaceutical products where it is often required in order to minimize metallic contamination. ASTM F138[3]-compliant steel is also used in the manufacture of body piercing jewellery[4] and body modification implants.

440 and 420 stainless steels, known also by the name "Cutlery Stainless Steel", are high carbon steels alloyed with chromium. They have very good corrosion resistance compared to other cutlery steels, but their corrosion resistance is inferior to 316 stainless. Biomedical cutting instruments are often made from 440 or 420 stainless due to its high hardness coupled with acceptable corrosion resistance.
Long story short, not all "surgical stainless steel" is safe for initial or healed piercings. Your piercer should be able to show you metal certs from the manufacturers they use and explain these details. For further info on safe materials for piercing, please visit safepiercing.org.   
Allergic reactions, when they occur, are rarely due to the stainless steel but from other factors (most commonly from mechanical irritation or harsh cleaning products). Allergic reactions typically include itching, redness, and swelling, with a discharge of clear fluid that is not lymph. The element in stainless steel that causes allergic reactions in some people is nickel.  Polishing the jewelry to a mirror like luster results in a protective layer of chromium oxide which reduces the migration of the Nickel content into the tissue.

One disadvantage of steel is its weight. For larger pieces of jewelry this can be a problem as it can cause tension in the body tissue, and also unwanted stretching or tearing of a piercing. In areas with low blood circulation, such as the earlobe, this can be potentially dangerous. However, with smaller jewelry, there is no need to worry.

Another downside is its tendency to become very cold during winter. This can cause problems; due to this, many change their jewelry to others made of horn, bone, wood, plastics and glass during winter.

Steel body jewelry may be sterilized in an autoclave.

The two most common standards that apply to body jewelry made of steel are ASTM F138 and ISO 5832-1 which describe the qualities of steel for surgical implants.

The only quality recommended for use by the Association of Professional Piercers is steel that is certified to meet ASTM or ISO standards for surgical implant applications.
"Surgical Steel is made of a variety of alloys. Many of them are used for body jewelry, but only a few specific grades are proven biocompatible"

Titanium

Titanium body jewelry is often manufactured in either commercially pure grades 1 to 4, grade 5 TI6AL4V alloy or grade 23 Ti6AL4V ELI alloy.

The only quality recommended for use by the Association of Professional Piercers is Titanium that is certified to meet ASTM or ISO standards for surgical implant applications. "Look for implant certified titanium (Ti6Al4V ELI) that is ASTM F136 compliant or ISO 5832-3 compliant, or commercially pure titanium that is ASTM F67 compliant.".

Pure and alloyed qualities have long been used for both piercings and surgical implants, and very few long-term allergies and other complications have been reported, though as with any material they could arise after prolonged contact with the human body. Ti6Al4V ELI alloy contains aluminum and vanadium.

When the EU Nickel Directive came into force - high nickel bearing alloys were restricted from use in primary (new) piercings. Because of its virtually 'Nickel Free' content Titanium has become one of the preferred materials used in piercing jewellery within the borders of the EU.

Titanium jewellery is lightweight (around 60% the weight of stainless steel given the same volume), it is highly corrosion resistant and less likely to react with body fluids, is not magnetic, it can be anodized to create a layer of colored oxide on the surface. Common colors are yellow, blue, purple, green, and rainbow.

Titanium can be sterilized in an autoclave.

Niobium

Niobium is a metal resembling titanium, but it is softer and heavier. When using niobium in a piercing jewelry it has to be as pure as possible, the threshold value being 99.9% niobium. This is sometimes called "999 Niobium". Impurities in low quality material can lead to allergies.

Pure niobium doesn't react to body fluids, oxygen or cleaning agents. It can safely be autoclaved. It is allowed in healing piercings by the EU nickel law.

Niobium can be heat treated to obtain a permanently dim black surface. A Septum retainer in black niobium is practically invisible.

The selection of niobium jewelry is much smaller than that of titanium and other common metals, mainly because niobium jewelry is more expensive and more difficult to produce.

Bronze

Bronze is often used in larger piercings in the form of earweights and ethnic jewelry from Indonesia and other places of the world.

Bronze is an alloy of different metals but the most common blend (in piercing jewelry) is 90% copper and 10% tin.

When buying bronze jewelry, make sure to buy it from a serious manufacturer as some bronzes can contain arsenic which can "bleed" into your body. Bronze can also discolor the skin with a greenish color which can be removed but if it gets into open wounds it can permanently discolor the tissue.

Silver
Jewelry made out of silver, a noble metal, has been common for centuries in all forms of jewelry. It has a certain luster and can also be treated to make certain areas black which gives a nice contrast.

Gold

Gold is a noble metal with a long tradition for use in jewelry.

When using gold for piercings, a lower purity than 14 or 18 carat (58 to 75%) is not recommended.

Gold is about as soft as lead and is easily scratched. These scratches can irritate the body, especially in new piercings. Tongue jewelry made from gold is not recommended as chewing on the beads is common. To avoid the irritation of damaged jewelry from such scratches and flaws, gold colored titanium jewelry is a safer substitute.

Piercing jewelry is often made of a gold alloy, the most common being 18k, with 24k being entirely pure and much softer. 18k gold usually contains 75% gold and the remaining 25% copper, silver and traces of other metals. In lower quality gold, zinc, nickel and other irritants can also be found.

As said, gold jewelry should only be used in healing piercings if it is nickel free or palladium based. Allergy to gold is uncommon but it does exist, and then mostly from white gold. In some extreme cases, the copper in the jewelry can tarnish and cause greenish discoloring of the tissue.

Gold can become discolored from autoclaving. It could be several things, reaction to the chemical indicators, residues left from polishing or cleaning products, or corrosion of elements in the gold itself.

Experienced body piercing studios clean the jewelry with a jewelry steamer, and then an ultrasonic process with warm alkaline detergent, followed by a distilled or deionized water rinse, then an alcohol rinse to help remove residues. Use Class 5 or 6 integrating indicators instead of class 1 or 2 chemical process indicators for monitoring autoclave sterilization with gold.

Porcelain
Porcelain is high temperature fired stoneware. If the glaze is non-porous and free of toxic elements such as lead and cadmium it may be suitable for wear in healed piercings.

Glass

Glass is a common piercing material which has been used for thousands of years. For example, earplugs made of glass have been found in ancient Egyptian tombs.

If correctly shaped and manufactured, glass can be a functional material: comfortable to wear, tough, and safe for the body. However, cheaper glass beads that unprotected can easily break into shards. If you drop glass jewelry on the floor, you probably won't be able to use it again. Also if you have a cheap bead in a tongue piercing and accidentally chew on it, it can break into tiny shards and cause lacerations.

It is possible to sterilize glass in a steam-autoclave but the heat may cause cracking in cheaper products.

Polymers

Polymers (plastics) have been used for a long time for both implants and piercings. Early piercers often used it as a healing jewelry. After the piercing was done, a product resembling a thick fishing line was inserted in the hole and its end was rivetted together. When the piercing was healed, the plastic was cut and pulled out, and then real jewelry was inserted. The method is still in use today, but to a much smaller extent. There are many better and safer ways today.

Polymers can be light, with resistance to the body's chemical reactions and can be safe against most allergies. However, many polymers are absorbent and have a porous surface, which makes it necessary to often take the jewelry out and thoroughly clean or replace it to avoid infection or sensitization from residues.

PTFE
PTFE or Teflon was invented in 1938 and can be refined for use in the medical industry for prolonged contact with skin.

Refined PTFE can be made biocompatible. It is a lightweight plastic, it is bendable, autoclaveable, not visible with X-rays, not magnetic, and very stable. It is suited for implants and piercings, especially if some flexibility of the material is desired.

PTFE is commonly used as a retainer.

Acrylic, plexiglas

Acrylic, sold as plexiglas or any of a variety of names, is a transparent plastic, in piercing mostly used for plugs and tapers.

Due to the material's smoothness, it has been used for stretching. Many overenthusiastic wearers have damaged their holes with acrylic tapers.

It is not a safe material for damaged or new piercings and can not be heat sterilized by autoclave as it can melt or discolor. Acrylics can emit carcinogenic toxins above 70 degrees Fahrenheit (21° Celsius), which normal body temperature is above. It is also a fragile material and can easily crack, craze or shard if dropped. Jewelry made of acrylic has a tendency to collect body fluids and skin parts in tiny pores and fissures. The Association of Professional Piercers suggests that it may only be used for temporary wear in healed piercings.

Acrylic can be a chemical irritant or allergen, resulting in Acrylic monomer dermatitis from the decomposition of methyl methacrylate.

Gems

Gems or gemstones are mostly used as inlays in plugs and as beads in BCRs.

The quality varies widely with different gems, and it can be hard to find stones big enough without cracks and scratches.

Some stones may affect the body such as malachite which contains copper that can discolor the skin. Others may contain lead  or arsenic or other hazardous materials. However, stones are generally not a problem for the body as long as they don't have sharp or pointy edges or are not very heavy. They can most of the time be autoclaved, but some stones, such as opals can't stand the heat and should be cleaned some other way.

See Gemstones

Natural materials

Wood

Wood is a common material for plugs and other shapes. Wooden pieces tend to keep warm in cold conditions, they are lightweight, they often stay in place better than other plugs and also they allow the body to "breathe" so the piercing is less likely to smell as it might with other materials.

The downside of wood as body jewelry is if not cared for properly it may dry out and lose luster. This can be prevented with mineral oil or jojoba oil and avoiding excessive exposure to water.

It should not be autoclaved as that can cause cracking, warping, or splitting.

Wood has grain that will rise if not properly finished, dramatically changing the texture. The porosity of wood and inability to be safely sterilized renders it inappropriate as a material for initial piercings or unhealed stretches.

Some types of wood are strongly discouraged for piercing jewelry as they can cause allergic reactions or otherwise be irritating for the skin. Hardwood is preferable. Correctly treated, it doesn't swell, it's durable, stable, does not absorb a lot of moisture or body fluids, and the surface can be polished to be very smooth.

Wood is also an excellent basis for more advanced jewelry. The flat faces of a plug can be inlaid with gemstones or metals, etc. Wood can easily be shaped and it comes in many colors.

Amber

Amber is fossilized tree sap and has a long tradition of use in jewelry. Its most common color is a goldish yellow but it also comes in black, greenish, reddish, white, brown and blue and various blends. It can be found with natural inclusions of small animals, insects and plants which can be amazingly well-preserved.

Amber is commonly used for inlays in metal jewelry or in plugs made of horn, bone or wood etc., but there are also massive amber plugs.

The material has a smooth surface that is kind to the skin, but tends to be a little fragile and can't handle heat very well, so it shouldn't be autoclaved.

Fauna

Biological organic materials are quite common in the world of piercings and are what were used historically by many cultures. Like wood, they seem well suited as body jewelry as they are easily shaped and bone, horn, ivory etc. may be finished to an acceptably smooth surface. Biological organic materials seem to allow your body to "breathe." They get less cold than other hard solid materials due to their insulating properties during winter. However, like wood, they can dry and crack.

Badly cleaned materials can transfer remaining bacteria and such to the body of the jewelry-wearer, so therefore it is very important that you buy your jewelry from a company with ethical good manufacturing practices.

Lower quality jewelry might have scratches or cracks which can harbor bacteria, or poor finishes which can result in harsh textures.

Animal products that are not acquired legally are not suitable as a raw material for the manufacture of body jewelry. There are ethical alternatives for some material such as fossilized mammoth, mastodon, or walrus ivory, which is a mineralized material most commonly found in Siberia or Alaska. Every year, large amounts of mammoth ivory are exposed in the permafrost of Siberia. The abundance of mammoth ivory, and the fact that the trade is legal, has dealt a hard blow against the illegal ivory trade. Mammoth ivory can be found in more than the normal white/yellowish colors normal ivory has. This is because minerals in the ground sometimes color the ivory. Unless it is properly cared for, mammoth ivory is prone to cracking caused by changes in temperature and moisture levels.

Bone, horn, ivory and such should not be autoclaved, as it will destroy them. They are also unsuitable for unhealed piercings or for wear while stretching existing ones.

See also
Body piercing
Body piercing jewellery
Earring
Glass
Autoclave
Titanium
Gold
Silver
Niobium
Bronze

Sources
 Organic LLC: Information on care of natural materials, endangered wood species, possible allergic reactions to wood species, and more

References

Materials

de:Piercingschmuck